The Jesuit Community Cemetery on the campus of Georgetown University in Washington, D.C. is the final resting place for Jesuits who were affiliated with the university. It was first established in 1808 and was moved to its present location in 1854.

History 

The Jesuit cemetery was originally established in 1808 at the southern end of Healy Hall. The first person buried there was Thomas Kelly, S.J. on August 16, 1808. With the construction of Maguire Hall, university administrators ordered the cemetery to be moved to its present location in 1854, so that it would not be immediately next to the hall. This required the exhumation and relocation of the remains of 46 Jesuits. In 1964, a senior administrator proposed to university president Edward B. Bunn the idea of exhuming the bodies once again and removing them to the cemetery at Woodstock College in Maryland, as doing so would free up approximately one acre of land on the campus that could be used for building.

Today, the cemetery is situated in the middle of Georgetown's campus, between the Edward B. Bunn S.J. Intercultural Center and Harbin Hall. , the cemetery is the resting place for 350 Jesuits, 17 of whom served as president of Georgetown University. It is the oldest of the cemeteries owned by the university. As with other Jesuit cemeteries around the world, all of the headstones are uniform.

Notable interments 

Among the notable burials are:

Robert W. Brady
Edward B. Bunn
Gerard Campbell
Anthony F. Ciampi
William Francis Clarke
Edward I. Devitt
James A. Doonan
John Early
Enoch Fenwick
Lawrence C. Gorman
J. Hunter Guthrie
Patrick Francis Healy
 Timothy S. Healy
Joseph J. Himmel
Bernard A. Maguire
Horace McKenna
William McSherry
Robert Molyneux
Thomas Mulledy
W. Coleman Nevils
James A. Ryder
Francis C. Shroen
Francis X. Talbot

See also 
 Holy Rood Cemetery
 List of Georgetown University buildings
 List of Jesuit sites

References 

Burials at the Jesuit Community Cemetery
Roman Catholic cemeteries in Washington, D.C.
Georgetown University buildings
1808 establishments in the United States
Society of Jesus in the United States